Milka Marcília Medeiros Silva (born 18 July 1994) is a Brazilian indoor volleyball player. She is a current member of the Brazil women's national volleyball team.

Career
She participated at the 2013 FIVB U20 World Championship, 2015 FIVB U23 World Championship,  and 2019 FIVB Nations League.

Clubs 

  Osasco/Audax (2012–2013)
  São Caetano (2013–2015)
  São Bernado Vôlei (2015–2016)
  EC Pinheiros (2016–2018)
  Hinode Barueri (2018–2019)
  SESC-RJ (2019–)

Personal life
Milka is openly lesbian and is married with the Argentine volleyball player Emilce Sosa.

References

External links 

 FIVB profile

1994 births
Living people
Brazilian women's volleyball players
Middle blockers